Challa or Chala or Challah may refer to:

 Chala, a region in Peru
 Challa (moth), a genus of moth in the family Erebidae
 Challa Kondaiah, Chief Justice of Andhra Pradesh High Court
 Ger Challa, a Dutch chemist

In Judaism
 Chala (Jews), referring to Bukharan Jews who were allegedly forcibly converted to Islam
 Challah, a type of bread in Jewish cuisine
 Challah, a commandment in Judaism of  dough offering
 Challah (tractate), a section of the Talmud dealing with dough offering

See also

 Charla (name)

Surnames of Indian origin